Monique Adamczak and Olivia Rogowska were the defending champions, having won the event in 2013, however both players chose not to participate.

The Australian-duo Jessica Moore and Abbie Myers won the title, defeating Thai-sisters Varatchaya and Varunya Wongteanchai, 3–6, 6–1, [10–6].

Seeds

Draw

References 
 Draw

Bendigo Women's International 2 - Doubles